C.M. Dubey Postgraduate College or C.M.D. P.G. College  (formerly C.M.D. College) is a degree college located in Bilaspur, Chhattisgarh, India. Established in 1956, The college was inaugurated by Pt. Dwarika Prasad Mishra the then Vice Chancellor of the University of Sagar (now Dr. Hari Singh Gour University) on 31 July 1956. It is affiliated to Bilaspur University. It is one of the oldest institute of higher education of Chhattisgarh (erstwhile Madhya Pradesh).

History
Established in 1956, as CMD College with only two Faculties Commerce and Arts. It was affiliated to Pandit Ravishankar Shukla University, Raipur. In 1961, Science faculty was introduced. In 1983, college became affiliated to newly formed Guru Ghasidas University, Bilaspur. Since 2012, It is affiliated to Bilaspur University, Bilaspur.

Courses
 Bachelor of Science
 Bachelor of Arts
 Bachelor of Commerce
 Bachelor of Commerce (Computer Application)
 Bachelor of Business Administration
 Bachelor of Computer Application
 Bachelor of Education (B.Ed.)
 Master of Science
 Master of Arts
 Master of Commerce
 Master of Education (M.Ed.)
 Diploma in Education (D.Ed.)
 Master of Social Work
 Post Graduate Diploma in Computer Application
 Master of Science in Microbiology

See also
Government E. Vishwesarraiya Post Graduate College
Durga Mahavidyalaya, Raipur

References

External links
 

Universities and colleges in Chhattisgarh
Colleges affiliated to Atal Bihari Vajpayee Vishwavidyalaya
Education in Bilaspur, Chhattisgarh
Educational institutions established in 1956
1956 establishments in Madhya Pradesh